

Events

January–February 

 January 1 – The International Telecommunication Union, a specialist agency of the League of Nations, is established.
 January 15 – The 8.0  Nepal–Bihar earthquake strikes Nepal and Bihar with a maximum Mercalli intensity of XI (Extreme), killing an estimated 6,000–10,700 people.
 January 26 – A 10-year German–Polish declaration of non-aggression is signed by Nazi Germany and the Second Polish Republic.
 January 30
 In Nazi Germany, the political power of federal states such as Prussia is substantially abolished by the "Law on the Reconstruction of the Reich" (Gesetz über den Neuaufbau des Reiches).
 Franklin D. Roosevelt, President of the United States, signs the Gold Reserve Act: all gold held in the Federal Reserve is to be surrendered to the United States Department of the Treasury; immediately following, the President raises the statutory gold price from US$20.67 per ounce to $35.
 February 6 – French political crisis: The French far-right leagues rally in front of the Palais Bourbon, in an attempted coup d'état against the Third Republic.
 February 9
 Gaston Doumergue forms a new government in France.
 Greece, Romania, Turkey and Yugoslavia form the Balkan Pact.
 February 12 – 16 – Austrian Civil War: The Fatherland Front consolidates its power, in a series of clashes across the country.
 February 16 – The Commission of Government is sworn in, as a form of direct rule for the Dominion of Newfoundland.
 February 21 – Augusto César Sandino is assassinated in Managua, by the National Guard.
 February 23 – King Leopold III of Belgium succeeds to the throne, following the death (February 17) of his father King Albert I.

March–April 

 March 1 – Manchuria becomes Manchukuo, following an invasion by the Japanese.
 March 12 – Prime Minister Konstantin Päts stages a self-coup by declaring a state of emergency in Estonia, with the approval of the parliament, beginning the country's Era of Silence.
 March 13 – John Dillinger and his gang rob the First National Bank in Mason City, Iowa, United States, stealing $52,000.
 March 20 – The Great Hakodate Fire kills at least 2,166 people in southern Hokkaido, Japan.
 March 24 – The Tydings–McDuffie Act is passed, allowing the Philippines a greater degree of self-government from the United States.
 April 21 – The "surgeon's photograph" of the Loch Ness Monster, taken in Scotland by London gynaecologist Robert Kenneth Wilson and in 1994 admitted to be a hoax, is published in the Daily Mail London national newspaper.

May–June 

 May 1 – The May Constitution of 1934 heralds the beginning of the Austrofascist Federal State of Austria.
 May 15 – Kārlis Ulmanis establishes an authoritarian government in Latvia.
 May 19 – Kimon Georgiev stages a coup d'état in Bulgaria.
 May 23 – American outlaws Bonnie and Clyde are ambushed and killed by police in Bienville Parish, Louisiana.
 May 28 – Near Callander, Ontario, Canada, the Dionne quintuplets are born to Oliva and Elzire Dionne, becoming the first quintuplets to survive infancy.
 June 10 – Italy beats Czechoslovakia 2–1 after extra time, to win the 1934 World Cup, staged in Italy.
 June 14 – Adolf Hitler and Benito Mussolini meet for the first time, at the Venice Biennale.
 June 18 – The Indian Reorganization Act is enacted.
 June 27 – The Emir of Yemen and Ibn Saud of Saudi Arabia conclude a peace treaty.
 June 30 – July 2 – Night of the Long Knives in Germany: Nazis purge the Sturmabteilung (SA), the left-wing Strasserist faction of the Nazi Party, and prominent conservative anti-Nazis, in a series of political murders.
 June 30 – The Nazi Party SA camp Oranienburg becomes a national camp, taken over by the Schutzstaffel (SS).

July–August 

 July 13 – Hitler gives a speech to the Reichstag, justifying his purge. 
 July 25 – July Putsch: Austrian Nazis assassinate chancellor Engelbert Dollfuss, during a failed coup attempt.
 August 2 – Adolf Hitler becomes Führer of Germany, or head of state combined with that of Chancellor, following the death of President Paul von Hindenburg.
 August 8 – The Wehrmacht swears a personal oath of loyalty to Adolf Hitler. 
 August 15 – The United States Marine Corps leaves Haiti.
 August 19 – 1934 German referendum: In a referendum, 90% of the German population approves of Hitler's assumption of presidential powers, as Führer and Reichskanzler.

September–October 

September 4 – Evelyn Waugh's novel A Handful of Dust was first published in full.
 September 5 – 10 – The 6th Nuremberg Rally is staged by the German Nazi Party.
 September 8 – Off the New Jersey coast, a fire aboard the passenger liner  kills 134 people.
 September 15 – 1934 Australian federal election: Joseph Lyons' UAP Government is re-elected with a decreased majority, defeating the Labor Party, led by former Prime Minister James Scullin. Consequently, Lyons is forced to resume the Coalition with the Country Party, and include them in his government. Scullin steps down from the Labor leadership shortly after; he is replaced by future Prime Minister John Curtin.
 September 19
 The Soviet Union joins the League of Nations.
 Bruno Richard Hauptmann is arrested in connection with the Lindbergh kidnapping case in the U.S.
 September 21 – The Muroto typhoon in Honshū, Japan kills 3,036 people, and destroys the temple, schools, and other buildings in Osaka.
 September 22 – A gas explosion at Gresford Colliery in Wrexham, north-east Wales, kills 266 miners and rescuers.
 September 28 – Afghanistan joins the League of Nations.
 October 2 – A typhoon in Osaka and Kyoto, Japan, kills 1,660, injures 5,400, and destroys the rice harvest.
 October 6 – Events of October the 6th: the President of Catalonia, Lluís Companys, declares the Catalan State of the Spanish Federal Republic, but Spanish troops swiftly crush the Catalan forces, and arrest him and the members of the Catalan government. The autonomy of Catalonia is suspended until 1936.
 October 9 – King Alexander of Yugoslavia and French foreign minister Louis Barthou are assassinated, during the king's state visit in Marseille.
 October 16 – The Long March of the People's Liberation Army of the Chinese Communist Party begins.
 October 20 – November 3 – Charles Kingsford Smith makes the first eastward crossing of the Pacific Ocean, from his native Brisbane, Australia, to San Francisco, in the Lockheed Altair Lady Southern Cross. The November 3 Hawaii–San Francisco leg is the first eastward flight from Hawaii to North America.
 October 20 – November 5 – The MacRobertson Air Race is flown from RAF Mildenhall in England to Melbourne, Australia, to celebrate the centenary of the state of Victoria. The overall winner is the British de Havilland DH.88 Comet G-ACSS Grosvenor House, flown by C. W. A. Scott and Tom Campbell Black.

November–December 

 November 6 – Attempted exclusion of Egon Kisch from Australia begins.
 November 23 – An Anglo-Ethiopian boundary commission in the Ogaden discovers an Italian garrison at Walwal, which lies well within Ethiopian territory. This encounter leads to the Abyssinia Crisis.
 November 27– Daniel Salamanca Urey, President of Bolivia, is deposed in a military coup, and replaced by José Luis Tejada Sorzano.
 December 2 – The continental jazz group Quintette du Hot Club de France first performs in Paris, led by guitarist Django Reinhardt, with violinist Stéphane Grappelli.
 December 5 – Abyssinia Crisis: Ethiopian and Italian troops exchange gunfire. Reported casualties for the Ethiopians are 150, and for the Italians 50.
 December 21 – The orchestral suite Lieutenant Kijé, one of Sergei Prokofiev's best-known works, is premiered.
 December 27 – Persia becomes Iran.
 December 29 – Japan renounces the Washington Naval Treaty of 1922 and the London Naval Treaty of 1930.

Date unknown 
 Winter – Tadj ol-Molouk, Empress consort of Iran, and her daughters appear publicly in Tehran without a veil, leading to its abolition in the country.
 Abidjan becomes the capital of the French colony of Ivory Coast.
 The sonoluminescence effect is discovered, at the University of Cologne.
 The Australian frontier wars end, after 146 years.
 The Yomiuri Giants, a successful professional baseball club in Japan, is founded in Tokyo.

Births

January

 January 4 – Rudolf Schuster, 2nd President of Slovakia
 January 5 – Eddy Pieters Graafland, Dutch football goalkeeper (d. 2020)
 January 7
 Charles Jenkins, American sprinter
 Tassos Papadopoulos, Cypriot politician, 5th President of Cyprus (d. 2008)
 January 8 – Jacques Anquetil, French road cyclist (d. 1987)
 January 10 – Leonid Kravchuk, President of Ukraine (d. 2022)
 January 11 – Jean Chrétien, 20th Prime Minister of Canada
 January 14 
 Richard Briers, English actor (d. 2013)
 Pierre Darmon, French tennis player
 January 16 – Marilyn Horne, American mezzo-soprano
 January 17 – Cedar Walton, American jazz pianist (d. 2013)
 January 18 – Raymond Briggs, British writer and illustrator (d. 2022)
 January 20 – Tom Baker, British actor 
 January 21 – Ann Wedgeworth, American actress (d. 2017)
 January 22 – Bill Bixby, American actor and director (d. 1993)
 January 24 – Stanisław Grochowiak, Polish poet and dramatist (d. 1976)
 January 27 – Édith Cresson, Prime Minister of France
 January 30 – Tammy Grimes, American actress (d. 2016)
 January 31 – Eva Mozes Kor, Romanian Holocaust survivor and author (d. 2019)

February

 February 7
 Eddie Fenech Adami, 10th Prime Minister of Malta and 7th President of Malta
 King Curtis, African-American saxophonist (d. 1971)
 February 10 – Fleur Adcock, New Zealand poet
 February 11
 Manuel Noriega, Panamanian military dictator (d. 2017)
 John Surtees, British racing driver (d. 2017)
 February 12 – Anne Krueger, American economist
 February 13 – George Segal, American actor (d. 2021)
 February 14 – Florence Henderson, American actress, singer and television personality (d. 2016)
 February 15 – Niklaus Wirth, Swiss computer scientist
 February 17
 Sir Alan Bates, British actor (d. 2003)
 Barry Humphries, Australian actor, comedian
 February 18 
 Anna Maria Ferrero, Italian actress (d. 2018)
 Paco Rabanne, Spanish fashion designer (d. 2023)
 February 21 – Rue McClanahan, American actress (d. 2010)
 February 24
 Bettino Craxi, Prime Minister of Italy (d. 2000)
 Renata Scotto, Italian soprano
 Bingu wa Mutharika, Malawian President, economist (d. 2012)
 February 27 – Ralph Nader, American consumer activist and presidential candidate

March 

 March 1 – Joan Hackett, American actress (d. 1983)
 March 3 – Bobby Locke, American baseball player (d. 2020)
 March 4
 Anne Haney, American actress (d. 2001)
 Gia Scala, British actress (d. 1972)
 March 5 – Daniel Kahneman, Israeli economist and Nobel laureate
 March 6 – Milton Diamond, American sexologist and professor of anatomy and reproductive biology
 March 9
 Yuri Gagarin, Russian cosmonaut, first human in space (d. 1968)
 Joyce Van Patten, American actress
 March 14
 Eugene Cernan, American astronaut (d. 2017)
 Dionigi Tettamanzi, Italian cardinal (d. 2017)
 March 16 – Ray Hnatyshyn, Canadian statesman, 24th Governor-General of Canada (d. 2002)
 March 18 – Charley Pride, American country musician (d. 2020)
 March 20 – David Malouf, Australian writer
 March 23 – Ludvig Faddeev, Russian physicist and mathematician (d. 2017)
 March 25
 Johnny Burnette, American rockabilly singer, songwriter and musician (d. 1964)
 Gloria Steinem, American feminist
 March 26 – Alan Arkin, American actor
 March 30 – Hans Hollein, Austrian architect and designer (d. 2014)
 March 31
 Richard Chamberlain, American actor
 Shirley Jones, American singer and actress 
 John D. Loudermilk, American singer-songwriter (d. 2016)
 Carlo Rubbia, Italian Nobel physicist

April

 April 1
 Vladimir Posner, Russian journalist
 Pascal Rakotomavo, 10th prime minister of Madagascar (d. 2010)
 April 2 – Paul Cohen, American mathematician (d. 2007)
 April 3
 Pina Pellicer, Mexican actress (d. 1964)
 Jane Goodall, British zoologist
 April 5 – Roman Herzog, 9th President of Germany (d. 2017)
 April 6 – Anton Geesink, Dutch 10th-dan judoka (d. 2010)
 April 16 – Victor "Vicar" José Arriagada Ríos, Spanish cartoonist (d. 2012)
 April 11 – Mark Strand, Canadian-born American poet (d. 2014)
 April 18 – James Drury, American actor (d. 2020)
 April 20 – John Malecela, 6th prime minister of Tanzania
 April 24
 Jayakanthan, Tamil writer (d. 2015)
 Shirley MacLaine, American actress, dancer, writer
 April 29 – Pedro Verona Rodrigues Pires, President of Cape Verde

May

 May 3
 Henry Cooper, British boxer (d. 2011)
 Frankie Valli, American musician (The Four Seasons)
 May 4 – Tatiana Samoilova, Russian actress (d. 2014)
 May 9
 Alan Bennett, British playwright, screenwriter, actor, and author
 Lee Hong-koo, South Korean politician, 26th Prime Minister of South Korea
 May 21 – Bengt I. Samuelsson, Swedish biochemist, recipient of the Nobel Prize in Physiology or Medicine
 May 23 – Robert Moog, American inventor of the synthesizer (d. 2005)
 May 27 – Harlan Ellison, American writer (d. 2018)
 May 28 – The Dionne quintuplets, Canadian quintuplets, first known set of quintuplets to survive infancy: 
 Annette
 Cécile
 Émilie (d. 1954)
 Marie (d. 1970)
 Yvonne (d. 2001)
 May 30 – Alexei Leonov, Russian cosmonaut (d. 2019)
May 31 
Bhagwatikumar Sharma, Indian author and journalist (d. 2018)
 Jim Hutton American actor (d. 1979)

June

 June 1 – Pat Boone, American actor and singer
 June 4 – Dame Daphne Sheldrick, Kenyan conservationist and author (d. 2018)
 June 5 – Chennupati Vidya, Indian politician and social worker (d. 2018) 
 June 6 – King Albert II of Belgium
 June 7 – Koloa Talake, 7th prime minister of Tuvalu (d. 2008)
 June 9 – Jackie Wilson, American singer (d. 1984)
 June 11 – Henrik, Prince Consort of Denmark, French-born consort of the Danish monarch (d. 2018)
 June 15
 Rubén Aguirre, Mexican actor and comedian (d. 2016)
 Stefan Kwoczała, Polish motorcycle speedway rider (d. 2019)
 June 16
 Dame Eileen Atkins, British actress
 William F. Sharpe, American economist and Nobel laureate
 June 19 – Désiré Rakotoarijaona, 4th prime minister of Madagascar
 June 23 – Virbhadra Singh, Indian politician (d. 2021)
 June 26 – Dave Grusin, American composer, arranger, producer, and pianist
 June 27 – Ed Hobaugh, American Major League Baseball player
 June 28 
 Asker Abiyev, Azerbaijani mathematician
 Michael Artin, American mathematician
 June 29 – Susan George, American and French political, social scientist, activist and writer
 June 30
 C. N. R. Rao, Indian chemist
 Luiz Carlos Bresser-Pereira, Brazilian economist and social scientist

July

 July 1
 Alicia Terzian, Argentine conductor, musicologist and composer
 Ilselil Larsen, Danish actress
 Sydney Pollack, American film director (d. 2008)
 Jamie Farr, American actor
 July 3 – Stefan Abadzhiev, Bulgarian football player
 July 5 – Adriana Roel, Mexican actress
 July 7
 Raphael Owor, Ugandan physician, pathologist, academic and medical researcher
 Kedarnath Singh, Indian poet (d. 2018)
 July 8 
 Fred Stewart, Canadian politician
 Ole Lund, Norwegian barrister and industrial leader
 Marty Feldman, English comedy writer, comedian and actor (d. 1982)
 July 9 
 Pierre Perret, French singer and composer
 Michael Graves, American architect (d. 2015)
 July 10 – Jerry Nelson, American puppeteer (d. 2012)
 July 11 – Giorgio Armani, Italian fashion designer
 July 12
 Van Cliburn, American pianist (d. 2013)
 Ulf Schmidt, Swedish tennis player
 July 13
 Wole Soyinka, Nigerian writer and Nobel laureate
 Aleksei Yeliseyev, Russian cosmonaut
 July 14 – Ángel del Pozo, Spanish actor
 July 15 
 Harrison Birtwistle, British composer (d. 2022) 
 Tehemton Erach Udwadia, Indian surgeon and gastroenterologist (d. 2023)
 July 16 – George Hilton, Uruguayan-Italian actor (d. 2019)
 July 19 – Francisco de Sá Carneiro, Prime Minister of Portugal (d. 1980)
 July 22
 Louise Fletcher, American actress (d. 2022)
 Leon Rotman, Romanian sprint canoeist
 Oluyemi Adeniji, Nigerian career diplomat, politician (d. 2017)
 July 24 – P. S. Soosaithasan, Sri Lankan Tamil politician (d. 2017)
 July 28 – Bud Luckey, American voice actor, Pixar animator (d. 2018)

August 

 August 2 – Valery Bykovsky, Russian cosmonaut (d. 2019)
 August 3 – Jonas Savimbi, Angolan political and rebel leader (d. 2002)
 August 5 – Gay Byrne, Irish broadcaster (d. 2019)
 August 6 
 Gianfrancesco Guarnieri, Italian–Brazilian actor, lyricist, poet and playwright (d. 2006)
 Edmond Simeoni, Corsican politician and nationalist (d. 2018)
 August 8 – Cláudio Hummes, Brazilian Roman Catholic cardinal
 August 11 – Viktor Tolmachev, Russian engineer (d. 2018)
 August 13 – Gyoji Matsumoto, Japanese footballer (d. 2019)
 August 15 
 Nino Ferrer, French singer (d. 1998)
 André Bo-Boliko Lokonga, Congolese politician (d. 2018)
 August 16 – Angela Buxton, British tennis player (d. 2020)
 August 17 – Ben Humphreys, Australian politician (d. 2019)
 August 18
 Ronnie Carroll, Northern Irish singer (d. 2015)
 Roberto Clemente, Puerto Rican Major League Baseball player (d. 1972)
 Gulzar, Indian film director, lyricist and poet
 August 19 – Renée Richards, American ophthalmologist and tennis player
 August 20 – Armi Kuusela, Miss Universe 1952 from Finland
 August 22 – Norman Schwarzkopf, U.S. Army general (d. 2012)
 August 24 – Kenny Baker, English actor (d. 2016)
 August 25
 Zilda Arns, Brazilian pediatrician, aid worker (d. 2010)
 Hsiao Teng-tzang, Taiwanese politician (d. 2017)
 Ayatollah Akbar Hashemi Rafsanjani, 4th President of Iran (d. 2017)
 August 28 – Zeng Shiqiang, Taiwanese sinologist, scholar, and writer (d. 2018)
 August 30 – Anatoly Solonitsyn, Russian actor (d. 1982)

September 

 September 1 – Léon Mébiame, Gabonese politician (d. 2015)
 September 4
 Clive Granger, Welsh-born economist, Nobel Prize laureate (d. 2009)
 Juraj Herz, Slovak film director, actor, and scenic designer (d. 2018)
 Eduard Khil, Russian baritone singer ("Trololo") (d. 2012)
 Zaid ibn Shaker, 3-time prime minister of Jordan (d. 2002)
 Jan Švankmajer, Czech filmmaker, artist
 September 6 – Marshall Rosenberg, American psychologist and writer (d. 2015)
 September 7 
 Sunil Gangopadhyay, Indian author and poet (d. 2012)
 Omar Karami, 29th Prime Minister of Lebanon (d. 2015)
 September 8 – Peter Maxwell Davies, English composer (d. 2016)
 September 9
 Nicholas Liverpool, Dominican lawyer, politician, and 6th President of Dominica (d. 2015)
 Waldo Machado, Brazilian footballer (d. 2019)
 September 13 – Zbigniew Zapasiewicz, Polish actor (d. 2009)
 September 16
 Elgin Baylor, American basketball player and executive (d. 2021)
 Ronnie Drew, Irish singer with The Dubliners band (d. 2008)
 September 17 – Maureen Connolly, American tennis player (d. 1969)
 September 19 – Brian Epstein, British manager of the Beatles, co-founder of Northern Songs (d. 1967)
 September 20
 Rajinder Puri, Indian cartoonist, veteran columnist and political activist (d. 2015)
 Sophia Loren, Italian actress
 Takayuki Kubota, Japanese martial artist, founder of the Gosoku-ryu style of karate
 September 21
 Leonard Cohen, Canadian poet, novelist, singer and songwriter (d. 2016)
 David J. Thouless, Scottish-born condensed-matter physicist, recipient of the Nobel Prize in Physics (d. 2019)
 María Rubio, Mexican actress (d. 2018)
 September 23 – Ahmad Shah Khan, Crown Prince of Afghanistan
 September 27 – Wilford Brimley, American actor and singer (d. 2020)
 September 28 – Brigitte Bardot, French actress, animal rights activist
 September 29 – Idowu Sofola, Nigerian jurist (d. 2018)
 September 30 – Udo Jürgens, Austrian-Swiss composer, popular music singer (d. 2014)

October

 October 4 – Joe Williams, Cook Islands politician (d. 2020)
 October 7 – Amiri Baraka, African-American poet, playwright and activist (d. 2014)
 October 9 
 Jacobo Majluta Azar, 47th President of the Dominican Republic (d. 1996)
 Harald Grønningen, Norwegian cross-country skier (d. 2016)
 Abdullah Ibrahim, South African pianist and composer
 October 12 – Abd Al-Karim Al-Iryani, Prime Minister of Yemen (d. 2015)
 October 13 – Nana Mouskouri, Greek singer
 October 17 – Rico Rodriguez, Cuban-British musician (d. 2015)
 October 18 – Inger Stevens, Swedish actress (d. 1970)
 October 19
 Glória Menezes, Brazilian actress 
 Yakubu Gowon, Nigerian politician
 October 20 – Empress Michiko, Empress consort of Japan
 October 28 – Martin van der Borgh, Dutch cyclist (d. 2018)
 October 29 – Richard, 6th Prince of Sayn-Wittgenstein-Berleburg (d. 2017)
 October 30 – Frans Brüggen, Dutch musician (d. 2014)
 October 31 – Princess Margaretha, Mrs. Ambler, Princess of Sweden

November

 November 1 – Umberto Agnelli, Swiss-born automobile executive (d. 2004)
 November 2 – Ken Rosewall, Australian tennis champion
 November 5 – Kira Muratova, Ukrainian film director, screenwriter and actress (d. 2018)
 November 9
 Ingvar Carlsson, twice prime minister of Sweden
 Hamilton Green, 4th prime minister of Guyana
 Carl Sagan, American astronomer, writer, and TV presenter (d. 1996)
Tengiz Sigua, 2nd Prime Minister of Georgia (d. 2020)
 November 11 – Elżbieta Krzesińska, Polish athlete (d. 2015)
 November 12 – Charles Manson, American cult leader and murderer (d. 2017)
 November 13 – Garry Marshall, American film producer, director and actor (d. 2016)
 November 21 – Carl-Henning Wijkmark, Swedish novelist and translator (d. 2020)
 November 23 – Lew Hoad, Australian tennis champion (d. 1994)
 November 24 – Alfred Schnittke, Soviet (Volga German) composer (d. 1998)
 November 30 – Lansana Conté, President of Guinea (d. 2008)

December

 December 1 – Billy Paul, African-American singer (d. 2016)
 December 3 
Abimael Guzmán, Peruvian politician, leader of Shining Path (d. 2021)
Viktor Gorbatko, Russian cosmonaut (d. 2017)
 December 5 – Joan Didion, American novelist (d. 2021)
 December 8 – Alisa Freindlich, Soviet and Russian actress
 December 9
 Judi Dench, English actress
 Junior Wells, American harmonica player (d. 1998)
 December 10 – Howard Martin Temin, American geneticist, recipient of the Nobel Prize in Physiology or Medicine (d. 1994)
 December 11 – Radha Viswanathan, Indian vocalist, classical dancer (d. 2018)
 December 12 – Miguel de la Madrid, 52nd president of Mexico (d. 2012)
 December 13 – Richard D. Zanuck, American producer (d. 2012)
 December 14 – Shyam Benegal, Indian film director and screenwriter
 December 15 – Abdullahi Yusuf Ahmed, 6th president of Somalia (d. 2012)
 December 16 – Meng Zhizhong, Chinese engineer (d. 2019)
 December 17 – Shan Tianfang, Chinese pingshu performer (d. 2018)
 December 18
 Marc Rich, Belgian-born commodities trader (d. 2013)
 Boris Volynov, Russian cosmonaut
 December 19
 Aki Aleong, Trinidad and Tobago-born American actor
 Pratibha Patil, President of India
 December 24 – Stjepan Mesić, 2nd President of Croatia
 December 25 – Phan Văn Khải, 5th Prime Minister of Vietnam (d. 2018)
 December 27– Larisa Latynina, Ukrainian gymnast
 December 28
 Alasdair Gray, Scottish fiction writer and artist (d. 2019)
Forough Farrokhzad, Iranian poet, writer and filmmaker (d. 1967)
 Maggie Smith, English actress
 Yujiro Ishihara, Japanese actor (d. 1987)
 December 30
 Del Shannon, American singer (Runaway) (d. 1990)
 Russ Tamblyn, American film and television actor

Deaths

January 

 January 1 – Jakob Wassermann, German writer (b. 1873)
 January 6 – Herbert Chapman, English football manager (b. 1878)
 January 7 – Augustin Dubail, French general (b. 1851)
 January 8 – Andrei Bely, Russian writer (b. 1880)
 January 10 – Marinus van der Lubbe, Dutch communist accused of setting fire to the Reichstag (executed) (b. 1909)
 January 11 – Helen Zimmern, German-born British writer and translator (b. 1846)
 January 15 – Hermann Bahr, Austrian writer and playwright (b. 1863)
 January 16 – Henry Walter Barnett, Australian photographer and filmmaker (b. 1862)
 January 21 – Aref Qazvini, Iranian poet, lyricist and musician (b. 1882)
 January 22 – Robert Brady, American criminal (b. 1904)
 January 23 –  Charles McLaren, 1st Baron Aberconway, Scottish politician and jurist (b. 1850)
 January 29 – Fritz Haber, German chemist, Nobel Prize laureate (b. 1868)

February

 February 2 – Maria Domenica Mantovani, Italian Roman Catholic religious professed and blessed (b. 1862)
 February 3 – Eleonora de Cisneros, American opera singer (b. 1878)
 February 5 – William Morris Davis, American geographer (b. 1850)
 February 9 – Claudio Williman, 20th President of Uruguay (b. 1861)
 February 17 – King Albert I of Belgium (b. 1875)
February 19 - Caleb Bradham, American pharmacist, inventor of Pepsi (b. 1867)
 February 21 – Augusto César Sandino, Nicaraguan revolutionary and rebel (murdered) (b. 1895)
 February 23
 Sir Edward Elgar, British composer (b. 1857)
 Geevarghese Dionysius of Vattasseril, Indian Orthodox priest and saint (b. 1858)
 February 25 – John McGraw, American baseball manager and MLB Hall of Famer (b. 1873)

March

 March 1
Wilhelm Diegelmann, German actor (b. 1861)
Charles Webster Leadbeater, British author and Theosophist (b. 1854)
 March 2 - John Smith Archibald, Canadian architect (b. 1872)
 March 7 - John Hamilton-Gordon, 1st Marquess of Aberdeen and Temair, Scottish politician, Governor General of Canada (b. 1847)
 March 14
 João do Canto e Castro, Portuguese army officer, 67th Prime Minister of Portugal and 5th President of Portugal (b. 1862)
 Prince Sixtus of Bourbon-Parma (b. 1886)
 March 15 – Davidson Black, Canadian-born paleoanthropologist (b. 1884)
 March 19 – Edward Montagu-Stuart-Wortley, British army general (b. 1857)
 March 20
 Emma of Waldeck and Pyrmont, Dutch Queen and regent (b.1858)
 Sydney Deane, Australian cricketer and actor (b. 1863)
 March 21
 Nicanor Abelardo, Filipino composer (b. 1873)
 Lilyan Tashman, American actress (b. 1896)
 March 27 – Francis William Reitz, 5th president of the Orange Free State (b. 1844)
 March 28 – Mahmoud Mokhtar, Egyptian sculptor (b. 1891)
 March 29 – Otto Hermann Kahn, German-born philanthropist (b. 1867)
 March 30
 Paul Cazeneuve, French politician (b. 1852)
 Ronald Munro Ferguson, 1st Viscount Novar, Scottish politician, 8th Governor-General of Australia (b. 1860)

April 
 April 7
 Béatrice Ephrussi de Rothschild, French socialite (b. 1864)
 Karl von Einem, German general (b. 1853)
 April 9 – Safvet-beg Basagic, Yugoslav writer (b. 1870)
 April 11
 Gerald du Maurier, British actor (b. 1873)
 John Collier, British painter (b. 1850)
 April 15 – Karl Dane, Danish actor (b. 1886)
 April 18 – Raffaele Garofalo, Italian criminologist and jurist (b. 1851)
April 21 - Carsten Borchgrevink, Anglo-Norwegian polar explorer (b. 1864)
 April 26
 Arturs Alberings, 6th Prime Minister of Latvia (b. 1876)
 John Hamilton, Canadian gangster (b. 1899)
 April 27 – Joe Vila, American sportswriter (b. 1866)
 April 28 – Charley Patton, American Delta blues musician
 April 30 – Hugh L. Scott, Major General of the US Army (b. 1853)

May

 May 12 - Gertrude Abbott Australian abbott (b. 1846)
 May 17 – Cass Gilbert, American architect (b. 1859)
 May 19 – Edward William Nelson, American naturalist (b. 1855)
 May 21 – James Durkin, Canadian-born American actor (b. 1879)
 May 23
 Clyde Barrow, American outlaw, member of Barrow Gang (b. 1909)
 Bonnie Parker, American outlaw, member of Barrow Gang (b. 1910)
 May 24 – Brand Whitlock, American journalist and politician (b. 1869)
 May 25 – Gustav Holst, British composer (b. 1874)
 May 26 – Prince Alfonso, Count of Caserta (b. 1841)
 May 29 – Eugenie Besserer, American silent film actress (b. 1868)
 May 30
 Tōgō Heihachirō, Japanese admiral (b. 1848)
 Julia Lopes de Almeida, Brazilian advocate and writer (b. 1862)
 May 31 – Lew Cody, American actor (b. 1884)

June

 June 8
 Dorothy Dell, American actress (b. 1915) 
 June 9 – Medeiros e Albuquerque, Brazilian poet and politician (b. 1867)
 June 10 – Frederick Delius, British composer (b. 1862)
 June 11 – Lev Vygotsky, Russian developmental psychologist (b. 1896)
 June 19 – Prince Bernhard of Lippe (b.  1872)
 June 27 – Francesco Buhagiar, 2nd Prime Minister of Malta (b. 1876)
 June 30 – Murdered during the Night of the Long Knives:
 Karl Ernst, Nazi SA leader in Berlin (b. 1904)
Fritz Gerlich, German journalist (b. 1883)
 Edmund Heines, Deputy SA leader (b. 1897)
Gustav von Kahr, German politician (b. 1862)
 Kurt von Schleicher, 23rd Chancellor of Germany (b. 1882)
 Gregor Strasser, German Nazi politician (b. 1892)

July 

 July 1 
 Ernst Röhm, German politician, Nazi SA Leader (assassinated) (b. 1887)
 Edgar Jung, German lawyer and political activist (assassinated) (b. 1894)
 July 3 
 Emma Irene Åström, Finnish teacher, Finland's first female university graduate (b. 1847)
 Duke Henry of Mecklenburg-Schwerin, Dutch prince consort (b. 1876)
 July 4
 Marie Curie, Polish-born scientist, recipient of the Nobel Prize in Chemistry and physics (b. 1867)
 Hayim Nahman Bialik, Russian-born Jewish poet, considered Israel's national poet (b. 1873)
 July 5 – Ahmad Zaki Pasha, Egyptian philologist (b. 1867)
 July 6
Alec B. Francis, English actor (b. 1867)
Prince Pedro Augusto of Saxe-Coburg and Gotha (b. 1866)
 July 8 – Benjamin Baillaud, French astronomer (b. 1848)
 July 10 – Erich Mühsam, German author (b. 1878)
 July 13 
 Kate Sheppard, New Zealand women's suffragist (b. 1848)
 Ignacio Sánchez Mejías, Spanish bullfighter (b. 1891)
 July 15 
 Louis F. Gottschalk, American composer (b. 1864)
 Jules Renkin, Belgian politician and 28th Prime Minister of Belgium (b. 1862)
 July 16 – Carlo Bergamini, Italian sculptor (b. 1868)
 July 20 – Padre Cicero, Brazilian Roman Catholic priest and reverend (b. 1844)
 July 21 – Hubert Lyautey, Marshal of France (b. 1854)
 July 22 – John Dillinger, American gangster (b. 1903)
 July 23 – María Pilar López de Maturana Ortiz de Zárate, Spanish Roman Catholic religious blessed and blessed (b. 1884)
 July 24 – Hans Hahn, Austrian mathematician (b. 1879)
 July 25
 François Coty, French perfume manufacturer (b. 1874)
 Engelbert Dollfuss, Austrian statesman and 10th Chancellor of Austria (assassinated) (b. 1892)
 Nestor Makhno, Ukrainian anarchist (b. 1888)
 July 26 – Winsor McCay, American comic creator and animator (b. 1869)
 July 27 – Hubert Lyautey, French general and colonial administrator. (b. 1854)
 July 28
 Marie Dressler, Canadian actress (b. 1868)
 Louis Tancred, South African cricketer (b. 1876)
 Edith Yorke, British actress (b. 1867)
 July 30 – Sir Henry Norris, British politician and businessman (b. 1865)

August

 August 2 – Paul von Hindenburg, German general and politician, 2nd President of Germany (b. 1847)
 August 7 – Hermann Kusmanek von Burgneustädten, Austro-Hungarian general (b. 1860)
 August 8 – Wilbert Robinson, American baseball manager and MLB Hall of Famer (b. 1863)
 August 9 – Alfred Steux, Belgian road racing cyclist (b. 1892)
 August 10 – George Hill, American director (b. 1895)
 August 13 – Mary Hunter Austin, American writer of fiction and non-fiction (b. 1868)
 August 14 – Raymond Hood, American architect (b. 1881)
 August 23 – Homer Van Meter, American criminal and bank robber (b. 1905)
 August 27 – Linda Agostini, British-born Australian homicide victim (b. 1905)
 August 28 – Sir Edgeworth David, British-born Australian geologist and explorer (b. 1858)

September

 September 1 – Fanny Davies, British pianist (b. 1861)
 September 2 – Russ Columbo, American singer and actor (b. 1908)
 September 9 – Roger Fry, British artist (b. 1866)
 September 10 – Sir George Henschel, English musician (b. 1850)
 September 13 – Serafina Astafieva, Russian ballet dancer (b.  1876)
 September 21 – Genevieve Stebbins, American author and teacher (b. 1857)
 September 22 – Charles Makley, American criminal (b. 1889)
September 27 – Ellen Willmott, English horticulturalist (b. 1858)

October

 October 5 – Jean Vigo, French film director (b. 1905)
 October 9
 King Alexander I of Yugoslavia (b. 1888) (assassinated)
 Vlado Chernozemski, Bulgarian revolutionary leader (b. 1897)
 Saint Innocencio of Mary Immaculate, Spanish Roman Catholic priest and saint (b. 1887)
 October 12 – Willy Clarkson, British costume designer and wigmaker (b. 1861)
 October 14
 Mikhail Matyushin, Russian painter and composer (b. 1861)
 Sir Arthur Schuster, German-born British physicist (b. 1851)
 October 15 – Raymond Poincaré, 58th Prime Minister of France and 10th President of France during World War I (b. 1860)
 October 17 – Santiago Ramón y Cajal, Spanish histologist and neuroscientist, recipient of the Nobel Prize in Physiology or Medicine (b. 1852)
 October 19 – Alexander von Kluck, German general (b. 1846)
 October 22 – Pretty Boy Floyd, American bank robber (shot by law officers) (b. 1904)
 October 24 – Giacomo Montalto, Italian socialist leader and politician (b. 1864)
 October 29 – Lou Tellegen, Dutch actor (b. 1881)

November

 November 2 – Edmond James de Rothschild, French philanthropist (b. 1845)
 November 3 – Sir Robert McAlpine, Scottish builder (b. 1847)
 November 8 – James Mark Baldwin,  American philosopher and psychologist (b. 1861)
 November 16 
 Alice Liddell, English inspiration for Alice's Adventures in Wonderland (b. 1852)
 Carl von Linde, German scientist and engineer (b. 1842)
Georgi Todorov, Bulgarian general (b. 1858)
 November 20 – Willem de Sitter, Dutch mathematician, physicist and astronomer (b. 1872)
 November 22 – Harry Steppe, American vaudeville performer (b. 1888)
 November 24 – Jirō Tamon, Japanese general (b. 1878)
 November 27 – Baby Face Nelson, American gangster (b. 1908)
 November 30 – Hélène Boucher, French aviator (b. 1908)

December

 December 1 
 Sergey Kirov, Soviet politician (b. 1886)
 Blind Blake, American blues singer (b. 1896)
December 4 - Adrien de Gerlache, Belgian explorer (b. 1866)
 December 5 – Oskar von Hutier, German general (b. 1857)
 December 6 – Charles Michael, Duke of Mecklenburg, head of the House of Mecklenburg-Strelitz (b. 1863)
December 7 – Mary Baker McQuesten, Canadian letter writer and missionary (b. 1849)
 December 9 – Alceste De Ambris, Italian syndicalist (b. 1874)
 December 26 – Wallace Thurman, American writer (b. 1902)
 December 28 
 Lowell Sherman, American actor and director (b. 1885)
 Pablo Gargallo, Spanish sculptor and painter (b. 1881)

Nobel Prizes 

 Physics – Not awarded this year
 Chemistry – Harold Clayton Urey
 Physiology or Medicine – George Hoyt Whipple, George Richards Minot, William Parry Murphy
 Literature – Luigi Pirandello
 Peace – Arthur Henderson

References

External links
 The 1930s Timeline: 1934 – from American Studies Programs at The University of Virginia